This article describes the qualification process for the EHF EURO 2024. In total 36 teams will compete for 20 remaining places at the final tournament.

Format 
Prior to the qualifiers, four teams were automatically qualified:
Germany as a host
three best placed teams from 2022 European Men's Handball Championship

Originally, the qualification process was about to start with Phase 1 in March 2021. The two best-placed teams from that phase would qualify for the relegation round along with the winner of the 2021 edition of the IHF Emerging Nations Championship. However, after postponing the Qualification Phase 1 and cancellation of the IHF Emerging Nations Championship, both caused by the COVID-19 pandemic, those two tournaments were merged into 2021 Men's IHF/EHF Trophy. The three best-ranked teams from that tournament qualified for the relegation round.

Relegation Round involves eight teams:
three entries from the IHF/EHF Trophy,
Luxembourg as the best ranked team according EHF ranking which haven't participate in the final phase of the previous qualification
Four worst-ranked fourth placed teams from the EHF EURO 2022 qualifiers
The four winners advance to the qualifiers – the latest stage of this qualification campaign.

Qualifiers will involve 32 teams:
four teams advanced from the relegation round
eight remaining teams from the EHF EURO 2022 qualifiers which failed to qualify for the final tournament
twenty teams which participated at EHF EURO 2022, but not directly qualified for EHF EURO 2024
Teams will compete for 20 places at EHF EURO 2024.

Qualification Phase 1 
Since only four teams would have participated in this round, no draw was needed. This phase was planned to be played in a tournament format. On 15 February 2021 the EHF announced that the tournament was postponed to 30 April to 2 May due to the COVID-19 pandemic.

On 26 March 2021, the Qualification Phase 1 was cancelled and replaced with the IHF/EHF Trophy.

IHF/EHF Trophy 

After the 2021 IHF Emerging Nations Championship was cancelled, the EHF announced in March 2021, that the IHF/EHF Trophy would take place in Tbilisi, Georgia, from 14 to 19 June 2021. The three best teams qualified for the relegation round.

Relegation round 
The four worst-ranked fourth placed teams from the previous cycle join in this round. The draw took place on 19 August 2021, when the teams will be paired in four two-legged ties.

Seeding 
The seeding was announced on 18 August 2021. Teams relegated from the 2022 European Men's Handball Championship qualification were placed into the seeding pot 2.

Overview 
All matches were played in January 2022.

|}

Matches 
All times are local.

Turkey won 64–54 on aggregate.

Finland won 52–45 on aggregate.

Latvia won 72–55 on aggregate.

Belgium won 59–53 on aggregate.

Qualifiers 
Qualifiers will be played between October 2022 and April 2023. Like in previous cycles, 32 teams will be divided into eight groups of four, with the winners and runners-up qualifying for the final tournament, together with the four best third-placed teams which will be determined taking into account only results against top two teams in each group. The draw took place on 31 March 2022.

Participating teams 

1 Belarus was excluded due to their involvement in the 2022 Russian invasion of Ukraine.
2 Russia was excluded due to the 2022 Russian invasion of Ukraine.
3 Georgia and Luxembourg, as two teams with the best records among the relegation round losers, replaced Belarus and Russia.

Seeding 
The seeding was announced on 22 March 2022.

Groups 
Times until 29 October 2022 are UTC+2, from 30 October 2022 on UTC+1.

Group 1

Group 2

Group 3

Group 4

Group 5

Group 6

Group 7

Group 8

Ranking of third-placed teams 
The results against the fourth-placed team are omitted.

Qualified teams

Note: Bold indicates champion for that year. Italic indicates host for that year.

Notes

References 

Qualification
European Men's Championship qualification
European Men's Championship qualification
European Men's Championship qualification
Qualification for handball competitions
European Men's Handball Championship qualification, 2024
Sports events affected by the 2022 Russian invasion of Ukraine